David Sampson is the name of:
 David A. Sampson (born 1957), U.S. Deputy Secretary of Commerce
 David Sampson (composer) (born 1951), American composer
 Dave Sampson (1941–2014), singer
 David Sampson (rugby league) (1947–2021), rugby league footballer and coach

See also
 David Samson (disambiguation)